Propebela golikovi is a species of sea snail, a marine gastropod mollusk in the family Mangeliidae.

Description
The length of the shell attains 7 mm.

Distribution
This marine species occurs off Sakhalin, Eastern Russia

References

 Bogdanov, IP. "New Species of Gastropods of the genus Oenopotina (Gastropoda, Turridae) from the Far-East Seas of the USSR." Zoologichesky Zhurnal 64.3 (1985): 448–453.

External links
 

golikovi
Gastropods described in 1985